Ornipholidotos gabonensis is a butterfly in the family Lycaenidae. It is found in Gabon, the Republic of the Congo, the Democratic Republic of the Congo and Angola. The habitat consists of forests.

References

Butterflies described in 1947
Ornipholidotos